Georgetown is an unincorporated Alaska Native village located in the Bethel Census Area of the U.S. state of Alaska. The population as of the 2010 census was 2, down from 3 in 2000.

Geography 
It is 16 miles (26 km) downstream of Red Devil just upstream of the mouth of the George River. Georgetown is accessible by boat, snowmobile (winter), or small plane.

History 
This section of the Kuskokwim river first had contact with non-Native explorers in the mid-19th century. Lt. Lavrenty Zagoskin of the Russian Imperial Navy explored the area in 1844. The village was known by its native name of Keledzhichagat at that time. It was used as a summer fish camp for residents of Kwigiumpainukamiut. In 1909, gold was discovered up the George River and a mining settlement quickly developed. This settlement was located on the bank of the Kuskokwim river just west of the mouth of the George River.

The settlement and the river were named for three traders named George: George Hoffman, George Fredericks and George Morgan. By 1910, the population of Georgetown increased to about 300 with about 200 dwellings due to the mining activity. A fire swept through the town in 1911 and destroyed most of these buildings. By 1953, the only large structure that remained at the original site was the two-story log house belonging to George Fredericks.

A second settlement began to develop east of the George River, and this settlement was also called Georgetown. A state school was established in 1965. As mining activity declined, residents began leaving and the school was closed in 1970.

The Alaska Native Claims Settlement Act provided an opportunity for the town's descendants to take ownership of the land, and the Native Village of Georgetown was established in 1971. As of 1 June 2009, the Georgetown Tribal Council had 128 members, and most surviving original members and their descendants still live in the vicinity.

Demographics

Georgetown first appeared on the 1980 U.S. Census as an unincorporated native village. It was given the designation of Alaskan Native Village Statistical Area (ANVSA) in 1990, although it reported no residents that census. It has reported 3 residents in 2000 and 2 in 2010.

References

External links 
Georgetown Tribal Council web site
 https://www.commerce.alaska.gov/dcra/DCRAExternal/community/Details/c3a6fa73-3250-429e-a237-00df5d36c109

Unincorporated communities in Bethel Census Area, Alaska
Unincorporated communities in Alaska
Unincorporated communities in Unorganized Borough, Alaska